This list comprises all players who have participated in at least one league match for Montreal Impact since the USL began keeping archived records in 2003. Players who were on the roster but never played a first team game are not listed; players who appeared for the team in other competitions (Open Canada Cup, CONCACAF Champions League, etc.) but never actually made an USL appearance are noted at the bottom of the page where appropriate.

A "†" denotes players who only appeared in a single match.
A "*" denotes players who are known to have appeared for the team prior to 2003.

A
  Hicham Aâboubou
  Luis Aguilar
  Reda Agourram
  Roland Aguilera
  Dan Antoniuk
  Andres Arango
  Zanzan Atte-Oudeyi

B
  Joel John Bailey
  Lloyd Barker
  Dwight Barnett
  Valery Jean-Louis Besse
  Eddy Berdusco *
  Patrice Bernier *
  Mauro Biello
  Philippe Billy
  Adam Braz
  Félix Brillant
  Roberto Brown
  Nikola Budalić
  Evan Bush
  Peter Byers

C
  Hassoun Camara
  Adrian Cann
  Paolo Ceccarelli *
  Wesley Charles
  Ian Clarke
  Frederick Commodore
  Kevin Cossette

D
  Youssef Dahha *
  Nick Dasović *
  Fabian Dawkins
  Nick De Santis *
  Jason de Vos *
  Stephen deRoux
  Massimo Di Ioia
  Leonardo Di Lorenzo
  Mignane Diouf
  Patrick Diotte *
  David Diplacido
  Jason DiTullio
  Srdjan Djekanović
  Rudy Doliscat *
  Tony Donatelli
  Paul Dougherty *

E
  Idriss Ech-Chergui
  David Ettedgui *

F
  Martin Fabro
  Patrice Ferri *
  Carl Fletcher *
  Abraham Francois
  David Fronimadis
  Masahiro Fukasawa

G
  Pa Amadou Gai
  Carlos Garcia
  Simon Gatti
  Charles Gbeke
  Ali Gerba
  Gabriel Gervais
  Joey Gjertsen
  Sandro Grande
  Gayson Gregory

H
  André Hainault
  Jean Harbor *
  Pat Harrington *
  Kevin Hatchi
  Tyler Hemming
  Lyndon Hooper *

I
  Mircea Ilcu
  Leo Incollingo

J
  Severino Jefferson
  Cédric Joqueviel
  Matt Jordan

K
  Drew Kopp
  Tom Kouzmanis
  Cameron Knowles
  Darko Kolić
  Luke Kreamalmeyer

L
  Luis Labastida
  Yuri Lavrinenko
  Anthony Le Gall
  Patrick Leduc
  Chris Lemire
  Nicolas Lesage
  John Limniatis *
  Onandi Lowe *
  Amir Lowery
  Lars Lyssand

M
  Rachid Madkour
  Alen Marcina
  Sita-Taty Matondo
  Elkana Mayard
  Pierre-Rudolph Mayard
  Larry McDonald
  Mesut Mert
  Miguel Montaño
  Frederico Moojen
  Tommy Moreland *

N
  Grant Needham *
  Christian Nuñez

O
  Ciaran O'Brien
  Leighton O'Brien
  Andrew Olivieri
  Giuliano Oliveiro *

P
  Matthew Palleschi
  Filipe Pastel
  Paulinho *
  Richard Pelletier
  Stefano Pesoli
  Nicolas Pinto
  Nevio Pizzolitto
  Rocco Placentino
  Ryan Pore

R
  António Ribeiro
  Mark Rowland
  Jocelyn Roy

S
  Kevin Sakuda
  Mauricio Salles
  Eduardo Sebrango
  Bill Sedgewick
  Kyriakos Selaidopoulos
  Chris Stathopoulos
  Alex Surprenant
  Greg Sutton

T
  Marco Terminesi
  David Testo
  Seth Trembly
  Steve Trittschuh
  Zourab Tsiskaridze
  Pierre-Richard Thomas

U
  Davy Uwimana

V
  Gustavo Villagra †
  Mauricio Vincello

W
  Andrew Weber
  Ian Westlake
  Chris Williams
  Kevin Wilson
  Kirk Wilson

Z
  Zé Roberto

Sources

Montreal Impact
 
Association football player non-biographical articles